1809 Prometheus  is an asteroid from the outer region of the asteroid belt, approximately 14 kilometers in diameter. Discovered during the Palomar–Leiden survey in 1960, it was given the provisional designation  and named after Prometheus from Greek mythology.

Orbit and classification 

Prometheus orbits the Sun in the outer main-belt at a distance of 2.6–3.2 AU once every 5.00 years (1,827 days). Its orbit has an eccentricity of 0.10 and an inclination of 3° with respect to the ecliptic.

Discovery 

It was discovered on 24 September 1960, by the Dutch astronomer couple Ingrid and Cornelis Johannes van Houten at Leiden, on photographic plates taken by Dutch–American astronomer Tom Gehrels at Palomar, California, in the United States. On the same night, the team of astronomers discovered several other minor planets including 1810 Epimetheus.

The survey designation "P-L" stands for Palomar–Leiden, named after Palomar Observatory and Leiden Observatory, which collaborated on the fruitful Palomar–Leiden survey in the 1960s. Gehrels used Palomar's Samuel Oschin telescope (also known as the 48-inch Schmidt Telescope), and shipped the photographic plates to Ingrid and Cornelis van Houten at Leiden, where astrometry was carried out. The trio are credited with the discovery of several thousand minor planets.

Naming 

This minor planet was named for Prometheus, a Titan from Greek mythology, who stole the fire from the gods. The name has also been given to a moon of Saturn, Prometheus (moon), discovered by the Voyager 1 spacecraft in 1980. The asteroid 1810 Epimetheus is named after his brother. The official  was published by the Minor Planet Center on 20 February 1976.

Physical characteristics 

According to the surveys carried out by NASA's Wide-field Infrared Survey Explorer with its subsequent NEOWISE mission, Prometheus measures 14.2 kilometers in diameter, and its surface has an albedo of 0.126. As of 2017, its spectral type, rotation period and shape remain unknown.

References

External links 
 Asteroid Lightcurve Database (LCDB), query form (info )
 Dictionary of Minor Planet Names, Google books
 Asteroids and comets rotation curves, CdR – Observatoire de Genève, Raoul Behrend
 Discovery Circumstances: Numbered Minor Planets (1)-(5000) – Minor Planet Center
 
 

001809
2522
Discoveries by Tom Gehrels
Discoveries by Cornelis Johannes van Houten
Discoveries by Ingrid van Houten-Groeneveld
Named minor planets
19600924